This is the discography of Argentine DJ and record producer Bizarrap, which consists of seventy-two singles and three promotional singles. Bizarrap is known for his "Music Sessions" in which he produces tracks featuring vocals by other artists. Some of the most popular Sessions contain vocals by Nathy Peluso, Tiago PZK, Villano Antillano, Quevedo, Shakira, Anuel AA, Nicky Jam.

Music Sessions

2019

2020

2021

2022–2023

Other singles

Freestyle Sessions
2018:
 "Bzrp Freestyle Sessions, Vol. 1" 
 "Bzrp Freestyle Sessions, Vol. 2" 
2019:
 "Bzrp Freestyle Sessions, Vol. 3" 
 "Bzrp Freestyle Sessions, Vol. 4" 
 "Bzrp Freestyle Sessions, Vol. 5" 
 "Bzrp Freestyle Sessions, Vol. 6" 
 "Bzrp Freestyle Sessions, Vol. 7" 
 "Bzrp Freestyle Sessions, Vol. 8"

Promotional singles

Other charted songs

Remixes
2017
 "No Vendo Trap (Bizarrap remix)"
 "21334 (Bizarrap remix)"
 "Legend (Bizarrap remix)"
 "Escalera Real (Bizarrap remix)" 
 "Tetrix (Bizarrap remix)" 
2018
 "Buho (Bizarrap remix)"
 "Amorfoda (remix)" 
 "Loca (Bizarrap remix)"
 "Wanda Nara (Bizarrap remix)"
 "Antes Que Sea Tarde (Bizarrap remix)" 
 "S.A.D. (remix)"
 "Fvck Luv (Bizarrap remix)"
2019
 "Aturdido (remix)" 
 "My Own (Bzrp remix)"

Other songs produced

Notes

References

Discographies of Argentine artists
Latin pop music discographies
Electronic music discographies